Ariari or Ariyari is one of the six blocks of Sheikhpura district of Bihar, India.

Geography of Bihar
Sheikhpura district